Legionella cincinnatiensis is a Gram-negative, non-spore-forming, aerobic bacterium from the genus Legionella which was isolated in Cincinnati from an open lung biopsy specimen from a patient who had hemodialysis because of an end-stage renal disease and suffered from bronchopneumonia.

References

External links
Type strain of Legionella cincinnatiensis at BacDive -  the Bacterial Diversity Metadatabase

Legionellales
Bacteria described in 1989